David Ekerot and Jeff Tarango were the defending champions, but Ekerot did not compete this year. Tarango teamed up with Roger Smith and lost in the first round to Luis Lobo and Javier Sánchez.

Lobo and Sánchez won the title by defeating Hendrik Jan Davids and Daniel Orsanic 7–5, 7–5 in the final.

Seeds

Draw

Draw

References

External links
 Official results archive (ATP)
 Official results archive (ITF)

1997 Doubles
Doubles
1997 in Romanian tennis